The EMD DE30AC and DM30AC are a class of 46 locomotives built between 1997–1999 by Electro-Motive Division in the Super Steel Plant in Schenectady, New York, for the Long Island Rail Road of the Metropolitan Transportation Authority (MTA) in New York. Originally divided equally between the two types, the fleet currently consists of 24 DE30AC locomotives (diesel power only) and 20 DM30AC locomotives (diesel or third rail power).

Details 
The DE30AC and DM30AC locomotives replaced aging GP38 locomotives, with GP38s used to push and pull diesel trains and other locomotives converted into power packs (cab control) used to provide head-end power for the trains. The bodies of the DE30AC and the DM30AC are extremely similar; the difference is the ability of the DM30AC to use electric third rail while the diesel engine is off, enabling the locomotive to use the East River Tunnels into New York Penn Station. This permits direct service from non-electrified lines in eastern Long Island via the western electrified main lines all the way to Penn Station. A few such trains a day run on the Port Jefferson, Montauk, and Oyster Bay branches, usually during peak times.

Single engines run with six cars or fewer, in which case the engine is on the east end of the train and a C3 cab car is on the west (Manhattan-facing) end. Generally, two engines are used when there are seven or more cars.

Of the original 46 locomotives, 44 are still in use. The locomotives retired include:
 DM30AC 503, which was damaged in an accident at Huntington on October 23, 2000. It hit a shopping cart on the tracks, which shorted out the third rail and caused the locomotive to catch fire. It sat in the LIRR's Morris Park Facility and had been stripped for spare parts to maintain the remainder of the fleet until July 2018, when it was scrapped.
 DM30AC 511, which was damaged in an accident on May 25, 2019. It hit a 14-unit long train stopped at a siding rated for 13 units of train length, which caused the locomotive to lose a third rail shoe and sustain frame damage. It is now sitting in the Morris Park Facility, most likely to be used for parts before being scrapped.

In addition, DM30AC 507 suffered an electrical cabinet failure. Unlike 503 and 511, it was salvaged by being converted into a DE30AC locomotive, renumbered to 423, and returned to service.

Planned replacement 
In December 2020, the Metropolitan Transportation Authority of New York board approved a Federal Transit Administration-funded $335 million contract for 27 dual-mode locomotives, based on the Siemens Charger design. The order also includes additional options for up to 144 more locomotives, of which 66 will go to the LIRR. The new locomotives will replace the older existing DE30/DM30AC locomotives in the future.

Gallery

See also 
 C3 (railcar)

References

External links 

EMD DE30AC/DM30AC Sell Sheet via Archive.org

Electro-diesel locomotives
DE30AC
Long Island Rail Road
B-B locomotives
600 V DC locomotives
Passenger locomotives
Diesel-electric locomotives of the United States
Railway locomotives introduced in 1997
Standard gauge locomotives of the United States